The Canadian federal budget for fiscal year 1986-1987 was presented by Minister of Finance Michael Wilson in the House of Commons of Canada on 26 February 1986.

External links 

 Budget Speech

References

Canadian budgets
1986 in Canadian law
1986 government budgets
1986 in Canadian politics